Arun Murugesan is an Indian Weightlifter. He won the silver medal in the Men's 62 kg category at the 2006 Commonwealth Games.

References

Year of birth missing (living people)
Living people
Indian male weightlifters
Commonwealth Games silver medallists for India
Weightlifters at the 2006 Commonwealth Games
Commonwealth Games medallists in weightlifting
20th-century Indian people
21st-century Indian people
Medallists at the 2006 Commonwealth Games